Garage was a Bar initiated 1990 in Bergen, Norway, with a branch established 2004 in Oslo. Both of the bars also have their own concert Departments. Bergen branch of Garage was created by Frode Svanevik together with veterans at the rock scene of Bergen, and quickly became one of the city's most popular venues, especially among students. Because of municipal rules on opening hours the bar was divided into two separate departments with different opening hours for several years. Garage is one of the most renowned rock clubs in Northern Europe.

As one of the most popular night clubs in Bergen, Garage is a vibrant melting pot and meeting place for music interested people. The Oslo Department premises that previously belonged rock club "So What". This is owned and operated by Garage, by Henning Christensen who took over as manager in 2001, in collaboration with the Oslo club "Café Mono. This department, in addition to a bar and concert venue, also outdoor seating. Both departments are adorned with statuettes that has been provided by various Spellemannpris Winners from their respective cities.

The bar went out of business in 2018.

References

External links 
Garage Bergen
Garage Oslo

Music venues in Bergen
Music venues in Oslo